The Retz Formation is a geologic formation in Austria. It preserves fossils of Metaxytherium krahuletzi, dating back to the Burdigalian stage of the Miocene period.

See also 
 List of fossiliferous stratigraphic units in Austria

References

Further reading 
 D. P. Domning and P. Pervesler. 2001. The osteology and relationships of Metaxytherium krahuletzi Deperet, 1895 (Mammalia, Sirenia). Abhandlungen der Senckenbergischen Naturforschenden Gesellschaft Frankfurt am Main 553:1-89

Geologic formations of Austria
Miocene Series of Europe
Neogene Austria
Burdigalian
Sandstone formations
Paleontology in Austria